The Leinster Schools Senior Challenge Cup is the premier rugby union competition for secondary schools affiliated to the Leinster Branch of the Irish Rugby Football Union (IRFU), and was first held in 1887.

Attendances are high for a schoolboy competition, with up to 25,000 present at the final. This match traditionally took place on Saint Patrick's Day at Lansdowne Road. In 2008, the final was played at the Royal Dublin Society Grounds (RDS) after Donnybrook proved to be too small for the 2007 final, (Lansdowne Road was closed for redevelopment) and has been the home since. Since the move to the RDS and live television coverage , the attendance has decreased and is now typically 10,000 to 14,000.

The competition has been subject to criticism from various quarters for putting undue pressure on its schoolboy participants, and for being "elitist" (most of the competing schools are fee-paying; as of 2020 the most recent tournament victory by a non fee-paying school was De La Salle Churchtown's 1985 win). It is also the subject of satire through the Ross O'Carroll Kelly newspaper column and novels. The competition and schools rugby in the four provinces has also been praised with "Irish (rugby) game in debt to schools rugby".

Blackrock College are the most successful school in the cup's history, having won 70 times, an accumulative total larger than all other teams combined.

History

Three schools have won the cup at their first attempt; Blackrock College in the competition's maiden year in 1887, Castleknock College who won the first of their eight Leinster titles at the first time of asking when they defeated Blackrock in the 1913 final and Clongowes Wood College who first won the cup in 1926. St. Fintan's High School and Temple Carrig School are the most recent 'new' schools to the competition, making their debuts in the 2016/17 and 2019/20 seasons respectively.

To date, only six schools have achieved the Senior and Junior Cup "double". These are Blackrock, who have achieved this feat 26 times (1910, 1912, 1927, 1933, 1935–36, 1942–43, 1945, 1948, 1953–54, 1956–57, 1962, 1964, 1981–82, 1986–87, 1995, 2004, 2006, 2013–14, 2018), St Michaels twice (2012 & 2019),  Newbridge (2020), Belvedere (2005), Terenure (1958) and Castleknock College (1920).

Even more rare is to lose both the Senior and Junior Cup Finals in the same year. This outcome has been experienced by seven schools on 12 occasions. Terenure College leads with 4 (1957, 1964, 1969 & 1987), followed by Belvedere College with 3 (1930, 1944 & 1962), next St Michaels College (2010), St Mary's College (1943), Newbridge College (1939), Cistercian College Roscrea (1910) and Blackrock College (2017) with 1 each. It happened to Blackrock College for the first time in 2017.

Blackrock College have only been defeated in successive finals on two occasions. In the 1920s they were runners up three times in a row, defeated by St Andrews in 1921 & 1922 followed by Belvedere in 1923. The second occasion was in 1979 & 1980 when they were defeated in successive finals by Terenure College.

The 91st Leinster Senior Schools Cup Final in 1977 was between Blackrock College and St Mary's College, and finished level at 12 points each at the end of normal time. Having played 70 minutes, the two sides now faced an additional 15 minutes extra time. Six minutes into extra time Blackrock got a try and conversion. Two further penalties in the second half of extra time sealed victory for Blackrock. The 1977 Leinster Senior Schools Cup Final was played on Sunday 20 March 1977 and not the normal St Patrick's Day. This decision was made to protect the Lansdowne Road pitch following poor weather prior to the Ireland v France Five Nations fixture on 19 March.

In September 1967, the then Minister for Education Donogh O'Malley introduced free secondary school education. Only very few rugby playing secondary schools opted to join the "Free Education" scheme. To date, only one of these non-fee paying schools has managed to win the Senior Cup. In 1983 and 1985, De La Salle Churchtown beat Castleknock College and Blackrock College.

Four captains have gained the distinction of lifting the cup twice, Larry McMahon (Blackrock College, 1929 and 1930), Garret Gill (Blackrock College, 1962 and 1963), Jonny Mion (Blackrock College) in 1989 and 1990, Barry Gibney (Blackrock College) in 1995 and 1996.

The cup, and the schools who play for it, have a history of producing rugby players who have gone on to play for the Ireland national rugby union team. Players such as Denis Hickie, who captained his St. Mary's College team to win the cup in 1994, and Gordon D'Arcy have extensive Leinster Senior Cup records. The most international players produced have come from Blackrock College, with players such as Hugo MacNeill, Brendan Mullin, Brian O'Driscoll, Victor Costello, Shane Byrne, Bob Casey, Leo Cullen, Luke Fitzgerald, Ian Madigan, Jordi Murphy, Garry Ringrose and Joey Carbery.

The 2020 season could not be completed due to the COVID-19 pandemic and as a result the title was deemed shared for the first time by Clongowes Wood College and Newbridge College. It was also only the forth time that no Dublin based school qualified for the final, 1932 (Pres Bray V Newbridge), 1941 (Newbridge V Roscrea), 2011 (Clongowes V Roscrea).

The 2021 cup campaign did not take place due to the ongoing COVID-19 pandemic.

In 2023 first round tie between Terenure College and Clongowes Wood College, Clongowes won 17-15 in a very tight game. However it emerged afterwards that Clongowes fielded an illegible player and the Schools committee ordered a replay. Clongowes also won the replay 20-19 with Terenure hitting the posts with a last minute penalty attempt.

Roll of honour

¹ Corrig School moved premises to Monkstown Park in 1950 and was renamed C.B.C. Monkstown.

² Mountjoy School was amalgamated with other schools in 1972 to become Mount Temple Comprehensive School.

3 SCT Final not played due to Covid 19. Cup shared.

Results

Records
Most consecutive wins: 6, Blackrock College 1900–05
Greatest winning margin in final: 63 points, 1900:  Blackrock College 63-0 Corrig School
Narrowest winning margin in final: 1 point, 1891: Blackrock College 1–0 Wesley College; 1969: St. Mary's College 10–9 Terenure College; 2008: Belvedere College 11–10 St. Mary's College
Highest aggregate score in final: 71 points, 2022: Blackrock College 50-21 Gonzaga College

Sponsorship and media coverage
The competition was known for several years as the "Coca-Cola Leinster Schools Senior Cup" and in later years the "Powerade Leinster Schools Senior Cup" (Powerade is also owned by the Coca-Cola Company). In September 2013, Beauchamps Solicitors became the title sponsor for the Leinster Schools Senior Cup. For the duration of this partnership with Beauchamps, the Senior Cup was known as the "Beauchamps Leinster Schools Senior Cup".

The competition receives coverage in Ireland's broadsheets, in particular the Irish Independent and The Irish Times. Both publish previews of each year's competition and provide match reports for each game played.

The competition's final on St Patrick's Day was previously broadcast on TG4, however, this was discontinued in the early 2000s. From 2005 onwards, however, Setanta Sports began coverage of school's rugby. This included the finals of all provincial finals and coverage of the Leinster Schools Junior Cup. The Leinster Senior Cup was most prominent, however, with coverage from every game played at Donnybrook and every round of the competition.

FreeSports replaced Eir Sport as the competition broadcaster ahead of the 2019 competition where they will broadcast eight games live.

Leinster School of the Year Award
In 2008, Leinster Rugby instituted an award for overall performance of a school at every level of schools rugby. The award, "Powerade Leinster Rugby School of the Year", has been given at an annual Leinster awards ceremony.

The inaugural winners were C.B.C. Monkstown. They were followed in by Terenure College (2009), St Gerard's School (2010), Clongowes Wood College (2011), St. Michael's College (2012), (2019) and Blackrock College (2013), (2018). Gonzaga College (2017)

Tiers
Schools Senior Cup Rugby in Leinster is divided into 4 tiers in two sections, and each cup competition bears a name. These 'tiers', in ascending order, include: Section A Leinster Schools Rugby Senior Development Cup (effectively division 4), Section A Leinster Schools Rugby McMullen Cup (effectively division 3), Section B Leinster Schools Vinnie Murray Cup (effectively division 2), Section B Leinster Schools Senior Challenge Cup (effectively division 1).

The second tier competition, the Leinster School's Vinnie Murray Cup, is contested by secondary schools affiliated to the Leinster Branch of the IRFU. It is named in memory of Vincent Murray, a teacher in Clongowes Wood college who trained the rugby team and died in December 1999. As of 2023, Catholic University School are the current champions, holding consecutive back-to-back titles, defeating St. Andrews in March 2023.  With five wins, C.B.C. Monkstown has won the Vinnie Murray Cup the most times. Wesley College the second most with four wins. Catholic University School the third most with three wins. Gonzaga College, and St Gerard's School have won the trophy twice. Kilkenny College and Temple Carrig School have won the cup once.

In popular culture
 The Ross O'Carroll-Kelly character, created by Paul Howard, lives off the glory of winning a Leinster Senior Cup final medal with the fictional school "Castlerock College" in the novel The Miseducation of Ross O'Carroll-Kelly.
 Gerard Siggins' series of novels, Rugby Spirit (2012), Rugby Warrior (2014), Rugby Rebel (2015), Rugby Flyer (2016) and Rugby Runner (2017) tell the story of a boy, Eoin Madden, who plays rugby for the fictional Dublin school "Castlerock College". He takes part in several campaigns with the school, including the Leinster Junior Cup. The school's name is an homage to that in Paul Howard's books, as Siggins had coined the name "Ross O'Carroll Kelly".

See also
 Leinster Schools Junior Cup
 Connacht Schools Rugby Senior Cup
 Munster Schools Rugby Senior Cup
 Ulster Schools Senior Cup
 Ireland national schoolboy rugby union team

Notes

External links
 CBC Monkstown Rugby (archived)
 Leinster Rugby
 Statistics compiled by Des Daly, Irish Rugby Statistician
 2009 preview, The Irish Times

High school rugby union competitions in Ireland
Rugby union competitions in Leinster
1887 establishments in Ireland